Cathleen Nesbitt  (born Kathleen Mary Nesbitt; 24 November 18882 August 1982) was an English actress.

Biography
Born in Birkenhead, Cheshire, England to Thomas and Mary Catherine (née Parry) Nesbitt as Kathleen Mary Nesbitt in 1888 of Welsh and Irish descent, she was educated in Lisieux, France, and at the Queen's University of Belfast and the Sorbonne. Her younger brother, Thomas Nesbitt, Jr., acted in one film in 1925, before his death in South Africa in 1927 from an apparent heart attack.

She made her debut in London in the stage revival of Arthur Wing Pinero's The Cabinet Minister (1910). She acted in many plays after that. In 1911, she joined the Irish Players, went to the United States and debuted on Broadway in The Well of the Saints. She also was in the cast of John Millington Synge's The Playboy of the Western World with the Irish Players when the whole cast was pelted with fruits and vegetables by the offended Irish American Catholic audience.

Nesbitt returned to the US and appeared on Broadway in Quinneys (1915) and John Galsworthy's Justice (1916) as John Barrymore's leading lady in his first dramatic stage role. After five other plays there, she returned to England. For the rest of the decade she performed in London; her roles included the title role in a revival of John Webster's The Duchess of Malfi. Her film debut was in the silent A Star Over Night (1919). She then performed in The Faithful Heart (1922). She did not appear in a film again until 1930, when she played the role of Anne Lymes in Canaries Sometimes Sing, which was an early talkie. In 1932, she appeared in The Frightened Lady. She appeared in the 1938 film version of Pygmalion as "a lady" who attends the Embassy ball. In the opening credits her first name was spelled as "Kathleen", but as "Cathleen" at the end of the film. She played the part of Mother in the 1949 BBC TV remake of the drama film Elizabeth of Ladymead.

Nesbitt's first Hollywood film was Three Coins in the Fountain (1954), in which she played the character role of La Principessa. This was followed that same year by Black Widow, in which she played Lucia Colletti. She was Cary Grant's Grandmother Janou in 1957's An Affair to Remember (though she was, in fact, only 16 years older than Grant) and, the following year, was part of the ensemble cast of Separate Tables. She also appeared in The Parent Trap (1961), and Promise Her Anything (1965).

Other Broadway appearances included Aunt Alicia in the original Anita Loos adaptation of Gigi (1951), Sabrina Fair (1953), and Anastasia (1954). In 1956, she played Mrs. Higgins in My Fair Lady starring Rex Harrison. Nesbitt reprised the role in 1981, in her 90s, in a Broadway revival, opposite Harrison, who was in his 70s.

She played Agatha Morley, the mother of a Congressman (played by William Windom) and mother-in-law to his former governess (played by Inger Stevens), on the TV series The Farmer's Daughter from 1963 to 1966. She guest starred on such shows as The United States Steel Hour; Wagon Train; Naked City, Dr. Kildare and Upstairs, Downstairs (as Rachel Gurney's mother, Mabel, Countess of Southwold).

In 1969 she played Richard Burton's mother in the film Staircase and again in Villain two years later. She had a small but memorable role as an elderly drug addict in French Connection II (1975) alongside Gene Hackman. Her next film was Hitchcock's Family Plot (1976), in which she played Julia Rainbird. She then appeared as the grandmother in Julia (1977). Her final film was Never Never Land (1980) as Edith Forbes.

Personal life
[[File:Cathleen Nesbitt in The Farmer's Daughter.JPG|left|thumb|Nesbitt in The Parent Trap (1961 film)]]

Nesbitt became the love of English poet Rupert Brooke in 1912, who wrote love sonnets to her. They were engaged to be married, but he died in 1915 at age 27 of blood poisoning, the result of a bite from an infected mosquito while he served in the Royal Navy during World War I.

Nesbitt lived for many years in the United States, but returned to the United Kingdom where she was appointed a Commander of the Order of the British Empire (CBE) in 1978. Her autobiography, A Little Love and Good Company, was published in 1973. After a career spanning over 80 years, Nesbitt died of natural causes at age 93 in London on 2 August 1982.

Partial filmography

Selected stage credits
 The Eldest Son by John Galsworthy (1912)
 The Perfect Cure by Stanley Houghton (1913)
 Loyalties by John Galsworthy (1922)
 Diversion by John Van Druten (1927)
 Good Losers by Michael Arlen and Walter C. Hackett (1931)
 Somebody Knows by John Van Druten (1932)
 Land's End by F.L. Lucas (1938)
 The Shop at Sly Corner by Edward Percy Smith (1945)
 The Uninvited Guest'' by Mary Hayley Bell (1953)

References

External links

Performances listed in the Theatre Archive, University of Bristol

Cathleen Nesbitt(Aveleyman)

University of Paris alumni
British film actresses
British stage actresses
British television actresses
20th-century British actresses
British memoirists
British people of Welsh descent
British people of Irish descent
Commanders of the Order of the British Empire
People from Birkenhead
1888 births
1982 deaths
British women memoirists
20th-century memoirists
20th-century British businesspeople